Swami Jitendranand (born 25 February 1972), also known as Acharya Jitendra, is religious saint, religious leader, monk, environmentalist activist, and he is the General Secretary of an NGO named Ganga Mahasabha founded by Madan Mohan Malviya in 1905.He is also serving as General secretary of Akhil Bhartiya Sant Samiti. A highest body of Hindu society of religious saint,leader and spiritual gurus. Apart from this. He is founder of Hind-Baloch Forum. An organisation dedicated to freedom of Balochistan and sacred Hindu Pilgrimage Hinglaj peeth. He has organised several seminar for Baloch freedom struggle throughout India. He is first religious petitioner against places of worship act 1991 in Supreme Court Of India.

He has been working for Ganga since 2000. He is a well known Social Activist (Environmentalist) in India. It was his effort to convince Mr. Lal Krishna Advani in 2008 to compel the Chief Minister B.C. Khanduri to abandon all state hydro-dam projects on the Ganga and persuade Professor Guru Das Agrawal G. D. Agrawal  to give up his fast within 24 hours. In 2010 again, Acharya Jitendra played a crucial role to stop the Loharinag Pala Hydel Project – On The Ganga. As K.N. Govinda said he worked behind the scenes for three years, interfacing with people and like Baba Ramdev and Acharya Jitendra, environmentalists and politicians of all hues. He even approached senior Congress leaders for their support. When a favourable atmosphere was created, he met Pranab Mukherjee, leading a delegation of the Ganga Mahasabha. He then spoke to senior Vishva Hindu Parishad leader Ashok Singhal and the Bharatiya Janata Party's Rajnath Singh, who persuaded CM Ramesh Pokhriyal to write to the PM, asking him to scrap the Loharinag Pala project. He challenged Tehari Dam project. He wrote a letter to Bihar Chief Minister Nitish Kumar demanding to rename Bakhtiyarpur after Chankya or Shilbhadra

References

1970s births
Living people
Deen Dayal Upadhyay Gorakhpur University alumni
Indian environmentalists